The 1882–83 Football Association Challenge Cup was the 12th staging of the FA Cup, England's oldest football tournament. Eighty-four teams entered, eleven more than the previous season, although five of the eighty-four never played a match.

First round

Replays

Second round

Replay

Third round

Replays

Fourth round

Fifth round

Semi finals

Final

References

 FA Cup Results Archive

1882-83
1882–83 in English football
FA Cup